Aquetong Creek is a tributary of the Delaware River in Solebury Township and New Hope, Bucks County, Pennsylvania.

History
The area surrounding Aquetong Creek was occupied by the Lenape people until the lower portion of what is now Bucks County was acquired by the Penn colony. The Lenape called the spring "Achewetong" or "Achewetank" meaning "at the spring among the bushes". A Lenape village was located at the spring up until about 1690. On 1 November 1710, James Logan, secretary to Penn and later mayor of Philadelphia, was granted  of land including the area of the spring. In 1707, Robert and Richard Heath built a gristmill along the Aquetong and on 2 November 1710, Richard was granted  of land from the confluence of the Aquetong to the Delaware to include the lower Aquetong valley and the mill. A fulling mill was constructed as early as 1712 by Phillip Williams. The first sawmill on the Aquetong appeared in 1740. In 1747 Jonathan Ingham purchased the Logan tract and constructed a fulling mill below the spring, who passed it on to his son, Dr. Jonathan Ingham, who  passed it on to his son, Samuel D. Ingham, famous as President Jackson's Secretary of the Treasury, who took possession in 1800. Later, Samuel likely abandoned the fuller mill and built the Ingham Springs Paper Mill, operating until his passing in 1860.
Aquetong Spring, as it was known by the Lenape, later known as Ingham Spring or the Great Spring, was said to have flowed as much as 3 million gallons per day. The spring flowed a short distance to a dam constructed in 1870 to produce Aquetong Lake or Pond, then flowed in Aquetong Creek generally eastward to the Delaware River in New Hope, PA. The dam has been recently removed to return the pond to its original pre-dam condition.

Statistics
The Geographic Names Information System I.D. number is 1168359
, the U.S. Department of the Interior Geological Survey I.D. is 03039.

Course

Municipalities
Bucks County
Solebury Township
New Hope

Crossings and bridges
South Sugan Road – NBI structure number 7352, bridge is long, Prestressed concrete, Box Beam or Girders-single or spread, single span, 2 lanes, constructed 1973.
Reeder Road

References

Rivers of Bucks County, Pennsylvania
Rivers of Pennsylvania
Tributaries of the Delaware River